Japan participated in the 1982 Asian Games held in New Delhi, India from November 19, 1982, to December 4, 1982. This country was ranked 2nd with 57 gold medals, 52 silver medals and 44 bronze medals with a total of 153 medals to secure its second spot in the medal tally.

References

Nations at the 1982 Asian Games
1982
Asian Games